Mildred "Chick" Strand (December 3, 1931 – July 11, 2009) was an American experimental filmmaker, "a pioneer in blending avant-garde techniques with documentary". Chick Strand contributed to the movement of women's experimental cinema in the early 1960s1970's. Strand's film making and directing approach incorporates personal elements from her own life experiences and societal forces and realities.  The film Elasticity (1976) is an example of Strand's attempts at autobiographical work that also incorporates Strand's specific standpoint on certain social issues. Feminist issues and anthropological inquiries about the human condition are frequent themes in Strand's films. However, because Strand's films and work were often deeply personal and subjective, they were often rejected from male-dominated academic circles of anthropologists and critiqued for being non-academic works.

Biography
Born Mildred D. Totman in Northern California she was given the nickname "Chick" by her father. She married her first husband, Paul Anderson Strand, in 1957, and they had one son, film editor Eric Strand, best known for his work on Donnie Darko. Chick Strand studied anthropology at the University of California, Berkeley, and in the early 1960s organized film happenings with Bruce Baillie. Bruce Baillie taught Chick Strand basic film technique before launching film projects together. Before becoming involved with film making, Strand was interested in photography and collages due to taking a photography course early on in life. In 1961, Strand established the Canyon CinemaNews, a monthly filmmakers' journal which became a focal point for the West Coast independent film movement. Baillie, among others, founded a filmmakers' collective called Canyon Cinema in 1967. Chick Strand made her first film at age 34.

Strand met her second husband, Neon Park, an artist, in the early 1960s in Berkeley. They were collaborators in art and life for over 30 years, dividing their time between Los Angeles and San Miguel de Allende, a small town in Mexico. Neon Park died from ALS (Lou Gehrig's disease) in 1993. In 1966 she enrolled in the ethnography program at UCLA, and after graduating in 1971 taught for 24 years at Occidental College. While in Mexico, Strand made documentary films about the people she met there. In later years she became a painter.

Though Chick Strand often incorporated female characters and narratives in her film, she denies being a part of the Women's Movement. Instead, she posits that her work is more about human experience in general, and not necessarily explicitly about female experience.

Career
Chick Strand's work during the 1960s, 1970s and 1980s influenced the subsequent era of subjectivity and ethnographic film in the 1990s.  The films that she produced during the 1960s and 1970s reflected the cultural and political atmosphere of the United States during that time, resulting in the films expressing liberal and radical overtones evidenced in the exploratory nature of her films. Strand used images in film to project her belief of cultural relativity and the importance of context.

Mosori Monika (1969) is a documentary about colonialism in Venezuela, told from the points of view of an elderly Warao woman, a Franciscan nun and the filmmaker herself. Other films on Latin America include Cosas de mi Vida (1976), Guacamole (1976) and Mujer de Milfuegos (Woman of a Thousand Fires) (1976). Strand's ethnographic films are distinctive for their complex layering of sound and image, and the juxtaposition of found footage and sound with original images. Later works include Cartoon le Mousse (1979), Fever Dream (1979) and Kristallnacht (1979). Fake Fruit Factory (1986) is included on the National Film Preservation Foundation's 2009 DVD Treasures IV: American Avant-Garde Film, 1947-1986.

Soft Fiction (1979) is a short film that includes various personal narratives, told from the points of view of 5 women, mostly about their sexual and sensual experiences.

Preservation
Her films have been screened at the Museum of Modern Art and the Tate. An early promotional film for Sears, made with Pat O'Neill and Neon Park, is held along with her complete body of work in the collection of the Academy of Motion Picture Arts and Sciences. The Academy Film Archive has preserved a number of Strand's films, including Cartoon Le Mousse, Eric and the Monsters, and Fever Dream. In 2011, Fake Fruit Factory was selected to the U.S. National Film Registry.

Legacy 
Chick Strand is best known for her unique use of camera and film editing techniques to portray metaphorical meaning through image. Strand often used camera techniques such as image overlapping and superimposed images in her films. Sound and image are relied upon to convey meaning through Strand's films.

Strand used film as an ethnographic method for investigating the lived experiences of various communities. She believed that traditional anthropological research methods of ethnography could be fused with art through film making. Her work explored notions of objective reality, philosophical questions of theory of mind, and the barrier between theories of mind and scientific reality. Themes of gender and sexuality are frequent topics of her work. Strand released the film Soft Fiction (1979) during the Second Wave of Feminism which included narratives and histories of women who experienced rape, incest, drug addiction and vulnerability. Strand used her position as filmmaker to explore notions of femininity and the male gaze that often dominates popular cinema and films. She attempted to deconstruct unequal power relations and structures through her work with experimental film.

Chick Strand's aesthetic style and editing techniques is of interest to film scholars. Her work has been reappraised by film scholars and continues to be studied for its influence in women's experimental cinema.

Filmography

References

External links
 
 Chick Strand (filmography) at Canyon Cinema

1931 births
2009 deaths
20th-century American women artists
21st-century American women artists
American experimental filmmakers
Collage filmmakers
Artists from the San Francisco Bay Area
American film directors
American documentary filmmakers
American women documentary filmmakers
Women experimental filmmakers